Thorsten Kaye (born Thorsten Ernst Kieselbach, 22 February 1966) is a German-British actor. His best known roles include Patrick Thornhart on One Life to Live, Dr. Ian Thornhart on Port Charles, Zach Slater on All My Children and Ridge Forrester on The Bold and the Beautiful.

Acting career
Kaye was born in Frankfurt, Federal Republic of Germany. He appeared in many classical theater roles, including The Winter's Tale, Tartuffe, Macbeth, Much Ado About Nothing, Hamlet, Love's Labour's Lost, Twelfth Night, and The Taming of the Shrew, both in London and with the Hilberry Repertory Company in Detroit.

Kaye then moved to Los Angeles, where he acted in many television shows, including the miniseries, Sidney Sheldon's Nothing Lasts Forever, before moving to New York to play Patrick Thornhart on ABC's One Life to Live (1995–1997). The character gained quite a bit of popularity, and it is where he would meet his real life partner, Susan Haskell. After completing a two-year stint on OLTL, Thorsten did some guest starring work for other shows, as well as starring in a few feature films.

In April 2000, Thorsten accepted the role of the dedicated physician Ian Thornhart (Patrick's older brother) on the ABC daytime soap (and the spin-off show of General Hospital), Port Charles (2000–2003). He appeared on the soap until its run ended in October 2003. Thorsten received two Daytime Emmy Award Nominations for Outstanding Lead Actor for his portrayal of Ian in 2003 and 2004.

In April 2004, Thorsten returned to New York to join the cast of the ABC soap All My Children in the role of casino owner, Zach Slater. He was nominated for two Daytime Emmy Awards in 2006 and 2009. Thorsten portrayed Slater until December 2009. He returned three times in 2010, and again in 2011 to bring Zach's storyline to a close when AMC came to an end after 41 years, in September 2011.

Thorsten Kaye has one of the lead roles in a new psychological thriller (feature-length film) titled Occupant, which was released in the U.S and Canada in October 2011 on demand in many cable/satellite markets as well as on most digital platforms, including iTunes, Amazon, Blockbuster, and PlayStation.

In 2012, Kaye began appearing in the role of Nick, a recurring character on the NBC series Smash. In October 2013, it was announced that Kaye was cast to portray Ridge Forrester on The Bold and the Beautiful, replacing originator Ronn Moss, who departed the series in 2012 after 25 years in the role.

Personal life
When not working, Kaye enjoys music, literature and riding American motorcycles. He is a fan of the Miami Dolphins and the Detroit Red Wings.

While appearing on One Life to Live, he met his partner, Susan Haskell, who played his on-show love interest (Margaret "Marty" Saybrooke). The two currently have two daughters, McKenna (born February 2003) and Marlowe (born January 2007).

Kaye was an active blogger for the Detroit Red Wings at NHL.com during the 2008 and 2009 Stanley Cup Playoffs.

Filmography

Awards and nominations

References

External links
 
 Thorsten Kaye profile
 ThorstenKaye.com – The Official Thorsten Kaye Web Site

1966 births
Living people
Wayne State University alumni
German expatriate male actors in the United States
Actors from Frankfurt
German poets
United States International University alumni
German male film actors
German male television actors
German male poets
German male soap opera actors